Lament is a studio album by German band Einstürzende Neubauten, released on 7 November 2014. The album is a studio reconstruction of a performance piece commissioned by the Belgian town of Diksmuide to commemorate the outbreak of World War I. Among the album's pieces are an opening track featuring lyrics that are not sung, but intended to be read by the audience.

The track "The Willy - Nicky Telegrams" is a duet between Alexander Hacke, playing Russian Tsar Nicholas II, and Blixa Bargeld, as Kaiser Wilhelm of Germany, discussing the diplomatic manoeuvring that led to war via telegram exchange. The two royals, first cousins by marriage, referred to one another as "Willy" and "Nicky". Elsewhere, "Der 1. Weltkrieg" is a sonic representation of each country's entry and retreat from the war, with each country represented by a pitched pipe.

The performance also includes two songs written by James Reese Europe, musical director of the United States' 369th Infantry Regiment, also known as the Harlem Hellfighters.

Track listing

References

Einstürzende Neubauten albums
2014 albums
Mute Records albums
German-language albums
Concept albums